Jessie Gordon "Obie" Bristow (April 17, 1900 – December 22, 1969) was a professional football player in the early National Football League for the Kansas City Cowboys and the Cleveland Bulldogs. He was also a professional player for the Hartford Blues, prior to that team's entry into the NFL in 1926.

Prior to his pro career, Bristow played college football for the Oklahoma Sooners. He earned a letter with the team in 1922.

References

 

1900 births
1969 deaths
Central Oklahoma Bronchos football players
Cleveland Bulldogs players
Hartford Blues players
Kansas City Cowboys (NFL) players
Oklahoma Sooners football players
People from Pryor Creek, Oklahoma
Players of American football from Oklahoma